Gus Coppens (born February 7, 1955) is a former American football tackle. He played for the New York Giants in 1979. Coppens played college football at UCLA and was drafted by the Los Angeles Rams in the 12th round of the 1978 NFL Draft.

References

1955 births
Living people
American football tackles
UCLA Bruins football players
New York Giants players
Los Angeles Express players